Sung Min (also Seong Min, ; born October 15, 1982) is a South Korean former swimmer, who specialized in freestyle and backstroke events. He represented South Korea in three editions of the Olympic Games (2000 to 2008), and held multiple national championship titles and swimming records in the relay freestyle and backstroke events (50, 100, and 200 m). Sung had also won a total of five bronze medals, including one from the 50 m backstroke, at the 2002 Asian Games in Busan, South Korea, and at the 2006 Asian Games in Doha, Qatar.

Career
Sung's Olympic debut came as a seventeen-year-old teen at the 2000 Summer Olympics in Sydney. There, he posted a lifetime best of 57.12 to lead the second heat of men's 100 m backstroke by exactly one second ahead of Uruguay's Diego Gallo, but finished only in thirty-first place from the prelims. Two years later, Sung won two bronze medals, as a member of the South Korean swimming team, in the men's 400 m freestyle and medley relay at the 2002 Asian Games in Busan, with a total time of 3:23.58 and 3:46.44, respectively.

On his second Olympic appearance in Athens 2004, Sung failed to reach the top 16 in any of his individual events, finishing thirtieth in the 100 m backstroke (56.78), and thirty-second in the 200 m backstroke (2:04.86).

At the 2005 Summer Universiade in Izmir, Turkey, Sung defeated Japan's Masafumi Yamaguchi and United States' Matt Grevers to earn a silver medal by two hundredths of a second (0.02) in the 50 m backstroke, posting a lifetime best of 25.59. The following year, he snared the bronze medal in the same event at the 2006 Asian Games in Doha, Qatar, lowering his time at 25.57 seconds.

Eight years after competing in his first Olympics, Sung qualified for his third South Korean team, as a 25-year-old, at the 2008 Summer Olympics in Beijing. He broke a new South Korean record on a bodysuit and cleared a FINA B-cut time of 55.43 (100 m backstroke) from the Good Luck Beijing China Open. In the 100 m backstroke, Sung challenged seven other swimmers on the third heat, including five-time Olympian Derya Büyükuncu of Turkey. He finished ahead of France's Benjamin Stasiulis in fourth place by a nine hundredth (0.09) margin, lowering his Olympic time to 54.99 seconds. Sung failed to advance into the semifinals, as he placed twenty-third out of 45 swimmers in the evening preliminaries.

Personal life
Born and raised in Cerritos, California, United States, Sung holds a dual citizenship to train and compete internationally for South Korea in swimming. He is now a founder and coach for age group swimmers at the Rapids Swim Club in Los Angeles.

References

External links
NBC 2008 Olympics profile

1982 births
Living people
South Korean male backstroke swimmers
Olympic swimmers of South Korea
Swimmers at the 2000 Summer Olympics
Swimmers at the 2004 Summer Olympics
Swimmers at the 2008 Summer Olympics
Swimmers at the 2002 Asian Games
Swimmers at the 2006 Asian Games
American emigrants to South Korea
South Korean Protestants
Asian Games medalists in swimming
South Korean male freestyle swimmers
Asian Games bronze medalists for South Korea
Medalists at the 2002 Asian Games
Medalists at the 2006 Asian Games
Universiade medalists in swimming
American sportspeople of Korean descent
American people of South Korean descent
Universiade silver medalists for South Korea
Medalists at the 2005 Summer Universiade
20th-century South Korean people
21st-century South Korean people